DollaBill Tour was a mini-concert tour by rock band Blink-182. Launched in support of the group's 2003 album Blink-182, the tour visited clubs in November 2003. As the name implies, tickets for the tour cost only $1. The series was supported by rapper Bubba Sparxxx and rock band the Kinison.

Background
The band initially wanted the tour to be free, but venues asked the group to charge a dollar in consideration with safety concerns.

Rapper Bubba Sparxxx and relatively obscure rock band the Kinison supported the group on tour dates. Barker called Sparxxx "one of my favorite rappers of all time." In describing the decision to feature eclectic supporting acts, Barker remarked, "We tour with punk rock bands every time we tour, so we’re just going to tour with bands we like now." DeLonge was similar:

Tour dates

Reception
Andrew Bealuon of Spin remained largely neutral in a review of the band's set at the 9:30 Club, commenting, "Whether in their set lists or their patter, Blink always give the kids what they expect […] [Hoppus and DeLonge]'s Martin and Lewis act remains proudly moronic." Bealuon noted that the band "clearly favored" their new material and rushed through many past hits.

Notes

External links
 

Blink-182 concert tours
2003 concert tours